Ulualoaiga Onosai Tuaolo Emelio (March 9, 1945 – January 9, 2007) was an American Samoan professional wrestler, better known by his ring name, Cocoa Samoa.

Professional wrestling career 
He began his training by studying martial arts in Japan. His had his first matches in Japanese promotions.

On November 15, 1982, as Sabu the Wildman, Cocoa partnered with Jimmy Hart to defeat Jerry Lawler in a handicap match for the AWA Southern Heavyweight Championship. Hart got the pin, but Sabu the Wildman was recognized as champion. He, however, was defeated by Terry Taylor for the title two weeks later.

By the mid 1980s he wrestled in the World Wrestling Council and Championship Wrestling from Florida. By the late 1980s he worked for the NWA Pacific Northwest Wrestling promotion under the name Cocoa Samoa. In the summer of 1986, Samoa traded the NWA Pacific Northwest Heavyweight Championship with Rip Oliver, holding it one time. He also held the NWA Pacific Northwest Tag Team Championship three times between March 1986 and May 1987, with partners Brady Boone, Ricky Santana, and Mike Miller. Also in Northwest, Samoa had a feud with Jimmy Snuka.

Personal life 
Samoa established a janitorial company to provide jobs to homeless people. He also worked for motorcycle companies, offering publicity by making cross-country rides. He spent time in prison after working as a money collector for a drug dealer. After being released from prison, Samoa became a preacher and visited other inmates to preach about Christianity.

He estimated that he had fathered 11 children by nine different women. At the time of his death, however, he was married to a woman named Esperanza and had five known sons and three daughters. He had 31 grandchildren and three great-grandchildren. During his career, he befriended other wrestlers such as Harley Race and Antonio Inoki. He was also close friends with Jimmy Snuka, whom he referred to as his brother.

Championships and accomplishments 
Continental Wrestling Association
AWA Southern Heavyweight Championship (1 time)
NWA Mid-America
NWA Mid-America Heavyweight Championship (1 time)
Pacific Northwest Wrestling
NWA Pacific Northwest Heavyweight Championship (1 time)
NWA Pacific Northwest Tag Team Championship (3 times)

References

External links 
 

1945 births
2007 deaths
20th-century professional wrestlers
American Samoan male professional wrestlers
People from Pago Pago
Stampede Wrestling alumni